Spice Stellar Nhance Mi-435 was announced in 2013 by Spice mobile Corporation. It is a dual-SIM phone with 4-inch capacitive touch display, which runs on Android Ice Cream Sandwich platform. It has 1 GHz dual-core processor and is backed with 512 MB RAM. The phone boasts an 8-megapixel main camera with fixed-focus uses CMOS sensor, 5x digital zoom, and video recording features and 1.3-megapixel front camera for video chat. On connectivity front, it has GPRS, 3G, Bluetooth, Wi-Fi, and micro USB.

Features
Spice mobile Corporation assured that Mi-435 comes with Android v4.0.4 latest version of Ice Cream Sandwich. Mi-435 is powered by Qualcomm Snapdragon 1 GHz S4 Processor it uses Snapdragon MSM8225 chipset which can handle multitasking and load applications According to Spice it has in-built audio-video player and decoder capable of offering 1080p HD video play. It comes with features like GPS/AGPS for location tracking, and Push Mail for smarter mail sync that conserves battery life, the Spice Stellar Nhance can be enhanced is secured with a 6-month subscription to NQ Mobile Security. It has an 8 MP camera with flash at rear and 1.3 MP camera at the front. The maximum value of SAR in this handset is 0.694Watt/kg.

Others
Spice Stellar Nhance Mi-435 has scored 6230 score in Antutu benchmark, 2700 in quadrant benchmark, which is a good score in its range.

Rooting and custom Rom
For rooting and flashing cmw. 
TreamBrust Rom is only custom rom available for mi435.

See also
 Spice Stellar Mobile Series
 Spice Digital
 Spice Telecom
 Spice MI-335 (Stellar Craze)
 Comparison of smartphones

References

External links
 Gadgets.ndtv.com
 Spicestellar.com
 Saholic.com
 Spicestellar.com
 Spicestellar.com

Smartphones
Android (operating system) devices
Mobile phones introduced in 2013